The 1993–94 Magyar Kupa (English: Hungarian Cup) was the 54th season of Hungary's annual knock-out cup football competition.

Quarter-finals

|}

Semi-finals

|}

Final

See also
 1993–94 Nemzeti Bajnokság I

References

External links
 Official site 
 soccerway.com

1993–94 in Hungarian football
1993–94 domestic association football cups
1993-94